Christopher Thomas Tamer (born November 17, 1970) is an American former professional ice hockey defenseman who played in the NHL with the Pittsburgh Penguins, New York Rangers, and Atlanta Thrashers.

Hockey career
As a youth, Tamer played in the 1983 Quebec International Pee-Wee Hockey Tournament with the  Michigan Dynamos minor ice hockey team from.

After playing two years in the junior league, Tamer was drafted by the Pittsburgh Penguins in the 4th round, 68th overall. Upon being drafted Tamer played for the University of Michigan for four years where he established himself as a strong defenseman and hard hitter. After college, he reported to the Penguins minor league affiliate Cleveland Lumberjacks for the 1993–1994 season. That season he also made his debut with the Penguins, playing in 12 games. After another year split between the Penguins and the Lumberjacks Tamer played with the Penguins full-time for another three years. Shortly into the 1998–1999 season Tamer was traded to the New York Rangers. Following that season the newly formed Atlanta Thrashers picked up Tamer in the 1999 NHL Expansion Draft. He played with the Thrashers for five years, providing veteran experience for the young team. He enjoyed the best season of his career during the 2000–2001 season, scoring 17 points and playing all 82 games in the season, the only time he played the full 82 game schedule. For the 2005–2006 season Tamer played in 14 games with the Chicago Wolves before retiring.

In 2016, Tamer was named an assistant coach for Team USA at the 2016 IIHF Women's World Championship.

Personal life
Tamer is married to Keely (née Libby) Tamer and they have three children together. 
Tamer is the owner of Crossfit Brighton.

Career statistics

Regular season and playoffs

International

References

External links

1970 births
Living people
American men's ice hockey defensemen
Atlanta Thrashers players
Chicago Wolves players
Cleveland Lumberjacks players
Ice hockey players from Michigan
Michigan Wolverines men's ice hockey players
New York Rangers players
Sportspeople from Dearborn, Michigan
Pittsburgh Penguins draft picks
Pittsburgh Penguins players